God Bless Guyana (GBG) was a political  party in Guyana led by Hardat Persaud. Its symbol was a dove carrying a wheat straw.

History
The party contested the 1997 general elections, but received only 314 votes and failed to win a seat. It attempted to register to run in the 2001 elections, but was disqualified by the Guyana Elections Commission.

References

Defunct political parties in Guyana